The Duchy of Brześć Kujawski, also known as the Duchy of Kuyavian Brest, was a district principality in the Central Europe, in the region of Kuyavia. Its capital was Brześć Kujawski. It was formed on 3 January 1268 in the partition of the Duchy of Kuyavia. Its first ruler was duke Władysław I Łokietek of the Piast dynasty. The state was conquered by the State of the Teutonic Order in 1332, during Polish–Teutonic War, with its capitol being captured on 21 April. Until 1300, it was an independent state, after what, it had become a fiefdom within the Kingdom of Poland, that in 1320, got transformed into the United Kingdom of Poland.

List of rulers 
 Władysław I Łokietek, Casimir II of Łęczyca and Siemowit of Dobrzyń (1267–1288)
 Władysław I Łokietek (1288–1300)
 Wenceslaus II of Bohemia (1300–1305)
 Wenceslaus III of Bohemia (1305–1306)
 Władysław I Łokietek (1306–1332)

Citations

Notes

References

Bibliography 
Jacek Osińsk, Bolesław Rodatka
Marcin Hlebionek, Bolesław Pobożny
Witold Mikołajczak, Wojny polsko-krzyżackie
Piotr W. Lech, Pierwsza wojna polsko-krzyżacka 1308-1343

Former countries in Europe
Former monarchies of Europe
Duchies of Poland
Fiefdoms of Poland
History of Poland during the Piast dynasty
13th-century establishments in Poland
13th-century disestablishments in Poland
States and territories established in 1238
States and territories disestablished in 1332
Former principalities